Strunjan is a settlement in the Municipality of Piran in the Littoral region of Slovenia.

Geography
The Strunjan Nature Reserve, located along a 4 km stretch of Adriatic coast to the north of the settlement, is the longest section of unspoiled coastline in the entire Gulf of Trieste.

Marian apparition

The former monastic church, now the parish church, in the settlement is dedicated to the Marian apparition at this place, in the night of August 14, 1512.

Events

Since 2001, Strunjan has held an annual persimmon festival every November. Together with the Vipava Valley and the Gorizia Hills, Strunjan has a favorable microclimate for persimmon cultivation, producing 30% of Slovenia's annual persimmon crop on about 20 hectares.

References

External links

Strunjan on Geopedia

Populated places in the Municipality of Piran
Slovenian Riviera
Spa towns in Slovenia